Marcus William Feldman (born 14 November 1942) is the Burnet C. and Mildred Finley Wohlford Professor of Biological Sciences, director of the Morrison Institute for Population and Resource Studies, and co-director of the Center for Computational, Evolutionary and Human Genomics (CEHG) at Stanford University. He is an Australian-born mathematician turned American theoretical biologist, best known for his mathematical evolutionary theory and computational studies in evolutionary biology, and for originating with L. L. Cavalli-Sforza the theory of cultural evolution.

Early life and education

Marcus Feldman was born and raised in Perth, Australia. His father Simon Feldman was an engineer, and this inspired him to take up mathematics. He studied at the University of Western Australia from where he matriculated in 1959, and graduated (with majors in mathematics and statistics) in 1964. In 1966 he obtained Master of Science degree in mathematics from Monash University. He went abroad to US to join a PhD programme at Stanford University. He earned his degree in 1969 under the supervision of Samuel Karlin in the Department of Mathematics. Karlin influenced him to pursue his research in population genetics using his computational know-how.

Professional career

After a brief work at Stanford as a research assistant for Karlin, and as acting assistant professor in the Department of Biology, Feldman returned to Australia to join at La Trobe University as a lecturer of mathematics. In 1971 he was appointed as assistant professor in the Department of Biological Sciences at Stanford, and went back to US. With L.L. Cavalli-Sforza in 1973, he originated the quantitative theory of cultural evolution, initiating a research program in cultural transmission and gene-culture coevolution. His own research into human molecular evolution such as in China led him to international recognition. He is the author of more than 625 scientific papers and several books on evolution, ecology, and mathematical biology.

In addition, he is the founding editor of Theoretical Population Biology (1971–2013) and an associate editor of Genetics, Human Genetics, Annals of Human Genetics, Annals of Human Biology, and Complexity. He was the editor of The American Naturalist from 1984 to 1990. He was a member of the board of trustees at the Santa Fe Institute from 1984 to 2006.

Award and honors

Guggenheim Fellowship in 1976–1977
Fellow of the Center for Advanced Study in the Behavioral Sciences, Stanford in 1983–84
Elected Fellow of the American Association for the Advancement of Science in 1986
Elected member of the American Society of Human Genetics 
Fellow of the American Academy of Arts & Sciences in 1987
Fellow  of the California Academy of Sciences in 1996
China Population Association Award in 1998
Honorary doctorate of philosophy from the Hebrew University of Jerusalem 
Honorary doctorate of philosophy from the Tel Aviv University 
Honorary professor at Beijing Normal University in 2002–2007
Honorary professor at Xi’an Jiaotong University in 2005 
Paper of the Year 2003 award for biomedical science from The Lancet in 2003
Dan David Prize in 2011
Elected member of the American Philosophical Society in 2011
Elected member of the US National Academy of Sciences in 2013
Kimura Motoo award in human evolution in 2016
Alumni lifetime achievement award, University of Western Australia, in 2016

References

1942 births
21st-century American biologists
Australian emigrants to the United States
Australian Jews
20th-century American mathematicians
21st-century American mathematicians
Monash University alumni
Evolutionary biologists
Stanford University alumni
Stanford University faculty
Stanford University Department of Biology faculty
Living people
Population geneticists
Theoretical biologists
People from Perth, Western Australia
Academic staff of La Trobe University
University of Western Australia alumni
Fellows of the American Association for the Advancement of Science
Fellows of the American Academy of Arts and Sciences
Members of the American Philosophical Society
Members of the United States National Academy of Sciences
Santa Fe Institute people
Center for Advanced Study in the Behavioral Sciences fellows